Córdoba Fault is a geological fault in central Argentina. The fault is dextral and makes up the boundary between the rocks of the Pampean Orogen and Río de la Plata Craton. Its is considered by scientists an extension of the Trans Brazilian Lineament.

References

Geology of Córdoba Province, Argentina 
Seismic faults of Argentina